Harold 'Dynamite' Payson (April 13, 1928 – March 23, 2011) was a boat builder and designer from South Thomaston, Maine, USA. Best known for his books on the "New Instant Boats" (heavily inspired by Phil Bolger) which utilize a modern boat-building technique using plywood and glue.  He was also a contributor to WoodenBoat magazine.

Married to: Amy Payson.

He served in the U.S. Navy during World War II, but returned to the Maine coast where he lived the rest of his life. He fished and later built boats at a shop he and his father built in 1952.

He leaves behind his four remaining children, including Neil Payson. He has many grandchildren and great grandchildren

Cause of death: Aortic aneurysm

External links
Harold Payson's website (scroll down for brief bio)
 Crosses the Bar . . . . H. H. (Dynamite) Payson

American naval architects
1928 births
2011 deaths
Engineers from Maine